"On Your Way Down" is a song by Australian indie-pop band The Jungle Giants. It was released in May 2017 as the second single from the band's third studio album Quiet Ferocity. The single was certified gold in Australia in February 2019.

Band member Sam Hales said "'On Your Way Down' is one of the main sonic identifiers for me on the record. It has a simple arrangement, though melodically it's very intense. I love how it makes you want to dance, but also clench your fists."

Reception
Emmy Mack from Music feeds described the track as an "infectiously groovy chilled-out toe-tapper" and "dancefloor-friendly".

Track listing
Digital download
 "On Your Way Down" – 3:45

Certifications

References

2017 songs
2017 singles
The Jungle Giants songs